Terry Allen (born June 27, 1957) is a former American football player and coach. He last coached at Missouri State. He was the head coach at the University of Kansas from 1997 to 2001, where he compiled a 20–33 record. He also served as the head coach of the University of Northern Iowa, where his 75–26 record made him the winningest coach in Gateway Conference history. His teams won or shared the Gateway title from 1990 through 1996, during which time he was named the Gateway Coach of the Year five of those seasons. Allen coached future NFL players Kurt Warner, Bryce Paup, James Jones, Kenny Shedd, and Dedric Ward while at the University of Northern Iowa. While head coach of the University of Kansas, Allen was accused of sheltering football players who had been accused of sexual assault. Allen retired from coaching following the last game of the 2014 football season, stating he was "done being a head coach."

Head coaching record

References

1957 births
Living people
American football quarterbacks
Iowa State Cyclones football coaches
Kansas Jayhawks football coaches
Missouri State Bears football coaches
Northern Iowa Panthers football players
Northern Iowa Panthers football coaches
Sportspeople from Iowa City, Iowa
Coaches of American football from Iowa
Players of American football from Iowa